Thadhu is a Maldivian three-part short film series developed by Madhoship Studio with regard to COVID-19 pandemic. The film is written and directed by Shamin Nizam. It narrates the consequences of the outbreak and perception of lockdown and new-normal in Male' City, through the eyes of three people. The project was developed in association with Health Emergency Operation Center, UNICEF and Health Protection Agency.

Premises

Ahmed
Ahmed Ibrahim (Ravee Farooq) and Aisha (Aishath Rishmy), are an unhappy married couple on the verge of separation. The couple manages to save their marriage from the brink of divorce, as they slowly become attached to each other during the lockdown period. Ahmed tests positive to COVID-19 from random sampling. As he is taken to isolation, contract tracing from his case commences, where sample is taken from his mother, father and younger sister, Ameema (Aisha Ali).

Amee
Ameema starts having panic attacks after the news of COVID-19 outbreak. As symptoms start developing, her mother (Mariyam Haleem) is taken into the quarantine facility located in Hulhumale' which worsen Ameema's situation. The whole family becomes worried about their mother, with no news and updates from the concerned authorities.

Dr. Nathasha
Dr. Nathasha (Nathasha Jaleel), is a hardworking frontline officer working her dream job in spite of all the barriers. Nathasha gets transferred to the Hulhumale' Medical Facility, where Ahmed's mother is quarantined. As Ahmed's mother suffers from lack of oxygen, her life becomes dependent on a medical ventilator. Despite the best effort from the doctors, she dies from the disease. Dr. Nathasha conveys the unfortunate news to the family. Ahmed blames himself for the demise of his mother, while the whole family becomes disoriented.

Cast and characters
 Ravee Farooq as Ahmed Ibrahim
 Aishath Rishmy as Aisha; Ahmed's wife
 Sara Shuaib as Sara; Ahmed and Aisha's daughter
 Mariyam Haleem as Ahmed and Ameema's mother
 Ali Farooq as Ahmed and Ameema's father
 Aisha Ali as Ameema; the younger sister of Ahmed
 Nathasha Jaleel as Dr. Nathasha
 Ahmed Asim as Yoosuf; the supportive husband of Dr. Nathasha

Soundtrack

Release and reception
Pre-screening of the film was organized on 3 December 2020 for dedicated staff working in the frontline. The short film series was released on 4 December 2020 in YouTube which was later made available for streaming through Baiskoafu.

Upon release, the film received positive reviews from critics. Ifraz Ali from Dho? picked the film as year's best released project while particularly praising the cinematography by Shahaain Ali and back music. Impressed with the performance by Ravee Farooq and Aishath Rishmy, Ifraz noted all the actors did full justice to their characters, though "dialogue delivery of Aisha Ali needs to be improved". Aishath Eeman from Avas calling the film "a relief to the pain of COVID" was equally impressed with the performance by Ravee and Rishmy while also highlighting the "spectacular work in combining each part in the screenplay".

References

Short film series
Maldivian web series